Aleksei Vladimirovich Bazanov (born 24 January 1986) is a Russian former professional footballer.

External links
 Profile at playerhistory.com
 

Russian footballers
People from Krasnoyarsk Krai
Russian expatriate footballers
Expatriate footballers in Latvia
FC Lada-Tolyatti players
1986 births
Living people
Russian expatriate sportspeople in Latvia
FC Sibir Novosibirsk players
Russian Premier League players
FC Arsenal Tula players
FC Baltika Kaliningrad players
FC Yenisey Krasnoyarsk players
Association football midfielders
FC KAMAZ Naberezhnye Chelny players
FC Tekstilshchik Ivanovo players
Sportspeople from Krasnoyarsk Krai